The following is a list of the most populous settlements in Jamaica.

Definitions 

The following definitions have been used:
City: Official city status on a settlement is only conferred by Act of Parliament. Only three areas have the designation; Kingston when first incorporated in 1802 reflecting its early importance over the then capital Spanish Town, Montego Bay being granted the status in 1980, and Portmore, whose municipal council was given the city title in 2018. It is not necessarily based on population counts, and while a honorific title, can confer some increased autonomy.
Town/Village: The Statistical Institute of Jamaica considers an urban area to be any area with 2,000 or more residents. A town would generally be considered to be ranked as a higher populated urban area, and a village as a minor urban area.
Neighbourhood: Geographically obvious subdivisions of any of the above.

Cities and towns

Cities 

** Country and parish capital

* Parish capital

Chief towns 
These are settled areas with 10,000 residents or more.

Towns and villages

Villages

 Accompong (Saint Elizabeth)
 Aeolus Valley (Saint Thomas)
 Airy Castle (Saint Thomas)
 Barking Lodge (Saint Thomas)
 Berry Hill (Manchester)
 Bog (Westmoreland)
 Big Woods (Westmoreland)
 Boscobel (Saint Mary)
 Bull Bay (Saint Andrew)
 Carmel (Westmoreland)
 Cattawood Springs (Portland)
 Clarendon Park (Clarendon)
 Cotterwood (Saint Elizabeth)
 Duckenfield (Saint Thomas)
 Four Paths (Clarendon)
 Haddersfield (Saint Mary)
 Hagley Gap (Saint Thomas)
 Hodges (Saint Elizabeth)
 Hopewell Hall (Saint Thomas)
 Hopewell (Clarendon)
 Hopewell (Manchester)
 Hopewell (Saint Andrew)
 Hopewell (Saint Ann)
 Hopewell (Saint Elizabeth)
 Hopewell (Westmoreland)
 Hopeton (Westmoreland)
 Knockpatrick (Manchester)
 Lloyds (Saint Thomas)
 Long Wood (Saint Elizabeth)
 Mavis Bank (Saint Andrew)
 Meadsfield (Manchester)
 Middle Quarters (Saint Elizabeth)
 Mount Rosser (Saint Catherine)
 Nanny Town (Portland)
 New Holland (Saint Elizabeth)
 New Market (Saint Elizabeth)
 New Roads (Saint Elizabeth)
 Newcastle (Saint Andrew)
 Nine Mile (Saint Ann)
 Old Pera (Saint Thomas)
 Paynes Town (Saint Elizabeth)
 Port Esquivel (Saint Catherine)
 Port Morant (Saint Thomas)
 Roxborough (Manchester)
 San San (Portland)
  Sheckles Pen (Clarendon)
 Stonehenge (Saint James)
 Walderston
 White Hall (Saint Elizabeth)
 Wood Hall (Saint Catherine)

Neighbourhoods

Kingston & St. Andrew

 Barbican
 Allerdyce
 Cherry Gardens
 Belgrade Mews
 Smokey Vale
 Constant Spring
 Denham Town
 Tivoli Gardens
 Jones Town
 Kencot
 Allman Town
 Rae Town
 Downtown Kingston
 Red Hills
 Stony Hill
 Mountain View
 Forest Gardens
 Forest Hills
 Forest Hills Gardens
 Duhaney Park
 Patrick City
 Patrick Gardens
 Washington Gardens
 Norbrook
 Queen Hill
 Meadowbrook
 Meadowbrook Estates
 Pembroke Hall
 Half Way Tree
 Eastwood Park Gardens
 Harbour View
 Port Royal
 Liguanea
 Mona
 Ithaca
 Papine
 Kintyre
 Beverley Hills
 Long Mountain
 New Kingston
 Trafalgar Park
 Hope Pastures
 Jack's Hill
 Riva Ridge
 Cross Roads
 Norbrook
 Trenchtown
 Riverton Meadows
 Seaview Gardens
 Callaloo Bed
 New Haven
 Waterhouse
 Backto
 Payne Land
 Olympic Garden
 Cockburn Gardens
 Greenwich Town
 Whitfield Town
 Marverley
 Pembrook Hall
 Zaidie Gardens
 Hughenden
 Havendale
 Molynes Gardens
 Vineyard Town
 Woodford Park
 Franklyn Town
 Eden Gardens
 Bournemouth Gardens
 Norman Gardens
 August Town
 College Common
 Elletson Flats

See also

 Demographics of Jamaica

References

External links

Origin of Jamaican Place names

 
Jamaica
Cities
City status